Oliver Hein (born 20 March 1990) is a German former professional footballer who played as a right-back or defensive midfielder for SSV Jahn Regensburg.

Career
Born in Straubing, Hein joined SSV Jahn Regensburg from FC Dingolfing in 2007. He made his professional debut for Jahn Regensburg during the 2009–10 3. Liga season in a 1–0 away loss to VfL Osnabrück.

During the 2013–14 season, manager Thomas Stratos moved him from the defensive midfield position to right-back.

In February 2020, Hein agreed a contract extension with Jahn Regensburg. He also announced his intention to retire in summer 2021 after 14 seasons with the club.

References

External links 
 

1990 births
Living people
People from Straubing
Sportspeople from Lower Bavaria
German footballers
Association football fullbacks
Association football midfielders
2. Bundesliga players
3. Liga players
Regionalliga players
SSV Jahn Regensburg players
Footballers from Bavaria